Sven-Erik Danielsson (born 10 February 1960 in Dala-Järna, Sweden) is a Swedish cross-country skier who competed from 1982 to 1998. His best World Cup finish was fourth in a 15 km event at West Germany in 1983.

Danielsson also finished 15th in the 15 kilometers event at the 1984 Winter Olympics in Sarajevo. In 1995, he won Vasaloppet.

Cross-country skiing results
All results are sourced from the International Ski Federation (FIS).

Olympic Games

World Championships

World Cup

Season standings

Team podiums
 1 victory
 2 podiums

References

External links

FIS-Ski.com profile

1960 births
Living people
People from Söderhamn Municipality
Cross-country skiers from Gävleborg County
Cross-country skiers at the 1980 Winter Olympics
Cross-country skiers at the 1984 Winter Olympics
Olympic cross-country skiers of Sweden
Swedish male cross-country skiers